Germán Julio Ferreyra (born 13 January 1996) is an Argentine professional footballer who plays as a defender for Russian club FC Yenisey Krasnoyarsk.

References

External links
 
 

1996 births
People from La Matanza Partido
Sportspeople from Buenos Aires Province
21st-century Argentine people
Living people
Argentine footballers
Argentina youth international footballers
Association football midfielders
Club Atlético Vélez Sarsfield footballers
Arsenal de Sarandí footballers
Unión La Calera footballers
Racing Club de Montevideo players
FC Akron Tolyatti players
FC Yenisey Krasnoyarsk players
Primera B de Chile players
Argentine Primera División players
Uruguayan Primera División players
Russian First League players
Argentine expatriate footballers
Expatriate footballers in Chile
Argentine expatriate sportspeople in Chile
Expatriate footballers in Uruguay
Argentine expatriate sportspeople in Uruguay
Expatriate footballers in Russia
Argentine expatriate sportspeople in Russia